This is the list of presidents and governors of the Brazilian state of Paraná.

Imperial period (1853 — 1889)

Republican period (1889 - present)

References

 List of Presidents of Paraná state 
 List of Governors of Paraná state 

Paraná
Paraná (state)